Kazimir Severinovich Malevich ( – 15 May 1935) was a Russian avant-garde artist and art theorist, whose pioneering work and writing had a profound influence on the development of abstract art in the 20th century. Born in Kiev to an ethnic Polish family, his concept of Suprematism sought to develop a form of expression that moved as far as possible from the world of natural forms (objectivity) and subject matter in order to access "the supremacy of pure feeling" and spirituality. Malevich is also considered to be part of the Ukrainian avant-garde (together with Alexander Archipenko, Sonia Delaunay, Aleksandra Ekster, and David Burliuk) that was shaped by Ukrainian-born artists who worked first in Ukraine and later over a geographical span between Europe and America.

Early on, Malevich worked in a variety of styles, quickly assimilating the movements of Impressionism, Symbolism and Fauvism, and after visiting Paris in 1912, Cubism. Gradually simplifying his style, he developed an approach with key works consisting of pure geometric forms and their relationships to one another, set against minimal grounds. His Black Square (1915), a black square on white, represented the most radically abstract painting known to have been created so far and drew "an uncrossable line (…) between old art and new art"; Suprematist Composition: White on White (1918), a barely differentiated off-white square superimposed on an off-white ground, would take his ideal of pure abstraction to its logical conclusion. In addition to his paintings, Malevich laid down his theories in writing, such as "From Cubism and Futurism to Suprematism" (1915) and The Non-Objective World: The Manifesto of Suprematism (1926).

Malevich's trajectory in many ways mirrored the tumult of the decades surrounding the October Revolution (O.S.) in 1917. In its immediate aftermath, vanguard movements such as Suprematism and Vladimir Tatlin's Constructivism were encouraged by Trotskyite factions in the government. Malevich held several prominent teaching positions and received a solo show at the Sixteenth State Exhibition in Moscow in 1919. His recognition spread to the West with solo exhibitions in Warsaw and Berlin in 1927. From 1928 to 1930, he taught at the Kiev Art Institute, with Alexander Bogomazov, Victor Palmov, Vladimir Tatlin and published his articles in a Kharkiv magazine, Nova Generatsiia (New generation). But the start of repression in Ukraine against the intelligentsia forced Malevich return to modern-day Saint Petersburg. From the beginning of the 1930s, modern art was falling out of favor with the new government of Joseph Stalin. Malevich soon lost his teaching position, artworks and manuscripts were confiscated, and he was banned from making art. In 1930, he was imprisoned for two months due to suspicions raised by his trip to Poland and Germany. Forced to abandon abstraction, he painted in a representational style in the years before his death from cancer in 1935, at the age of 56.

Nonetheless, his art and his writing influenced contemporaries such as El Lissitzky, Lyubov Popova and Alexander Rodchenko, as well as generations of later abstract artists, such as Ad Reinhardt and the Minimalists. He was celebrated posthumously in major exhibits at the Museum of Modern Art (1936), the Guggenheim Museum (1973) and the Stedelijk Museum in Amsterdam (1989), which has a large collection of his work. In the 1990s, the ownership claims of museums to many Malevich works began to be disputed by his heirs.

Early life

Kazimir  Malevich was born Kazimierz Malewicz to a Polish family, who settled near Kiev in Kiev Governorate of the Russian Empire during the partitions of Poland. His parents, Ludwika and Seweryn Malewicz, were Roman Catholic like most ethnic Poles, though his father attended Orthodox services as well. They both had fled from the former eastern territories of the Commonwealth (present-day Kopyl Region of Belarus) to Kiev in the aftermath of the failed Polish January Uprising of 1863 against the tsarist army. 
His native language was Polish, but he also spoke Russian, as well as Ukrainian due to his childhood surroundings. Malevich would later write a series of articles in Ukrainian about art, and identified as Ukrainian.

Kazimir's father managed a sugar factory. Kazimir was the first of fourteen children, only nine of whom survived into adulthood. His family moved often and he spent most of his childhood in the villages of modern-day Ukraine, amidst sugar-beet plantations, far from centers of culture. Until age twelve, he knew nothing of professional artists, although art had surrounded him in childhood. He delighted in peasant embroidery, and in decorated walls and stoves. He was able to paint in the peasant style. He studied drawing in Kiev from 1895 to 1896.

Artistic career

From 1896 to 1904, Kazimir Malevich lived in Kursk. In 1904, after the death of his father, he moved to Moscow. He studied at the Moscow School of Painting, Sculpture and Architecture from 1904 to 1910 and in the studio of Fedor Rerberg in Moscow. In 1911, he participated in the second exhibition of the group, Soyuz Molodyozhi (Union of Youth) in  St. Petersburg, together with Vladimir Tatlin and, in 1912, the group held its third exhibition, which included works by Aleksandra Ekster, Tatlin, and others. In the same year, he participated in an exhibition by the collective, Donkey's Tail in Moscow. By that time, his works were influenced by Natalia Goncharova and Mikhail Larionov, Russian avant-garde painters, who were particularly interested in Russian folk art called lubok. Malevich described himself as painting in a "Cubo-Futurist" style in 1912. In March 1913, a major exhibition of Aristarkh Lentulov's paintings opened in Moscow. The effect of this exhibition was comparable with that of Paul Cézanne in Paris in 1907, as all the main Russian avant-garde artists of the time (including Malevich) immediately absorbed the cubist principles and began using them in their works. Already in the same year, the Cubo-Futurist opera, Victory Over the Sun, with Malevich's stage-set, became a great success. In 1914, Malevich exhibited his works in the Salon des Indépendants in Paris together with Alexander Archipenko, Sonia Delaunay, Aleksandra Ekster, and Vadim Meller, among others. Malevich also co-illustrated, with Pavel Filonov, Selected Poems with Postscript, 1907–1914 by Velimir Khlebnikov and another work by Khlebnikov in 1914 titled Roar! Gauntlets, 1908–1914, with Vladimir Burliuk. Later in that same year, he created a series of lithographs in support of Russia's entry into WWI. These prints, accompanied by captions by Vladimir Mayakovsky and published by the Moscow-based publication house Segodniashnii Lubok (Contemporary Lubok), on the one hand show the influence of traditional folk art, but on the other are characterised by solid blocks of pure colours juxtaposed in compositionally evocative ways that anticipate his Suprematist work.

In 1911, Brocard & Co. produced an eau de cologne called Severny. Malevich conceived the advertisement and design of the perfume bottle with craquelure of an iceberg and a polar bear on the top, which lasted through the mid-1920s.

Suprematism
In 1915, Malevich laid down the foundations of Suprematism when he published his manifesto, From Cubism to Suprematism. In 1915–1916, he worked with other Suprematist artists in a peasant/artisan co-operative in Skoptsi and Verbovka village. In 1916–1917, he participated in exhibitions of the Jack of Diamonds group in Moscow together with Nathan Altman, David Burliuk, Aleksandra Ekster and others. Famous examples of his Suprematist works include Black Square (1915) and White On White (1918).

Malevich exhibited his first Black Square, now at the Tretyakov Gallery in Moscow, at the Last Futurist Exhibition 0,10 in Petrograd (Saint Petersburg) in 1915. A black square placed against the sun appeared for the first time in the 1913 scenic designs for the Futurist opera Victory over the Sun. The second Black Square was painted around 1923. Some believe that the third Black Square (also at the Tretyakov Gallery) was painted in 1929 for Malevich's solo exhibition, because of the poor condition of the 1915 square. One more Black Square, the smallest and probably the last, may have been intended as a diptych together with the Red Square (though of smaller size) for the exhibition Artists of the RSFSR: 15 Years, held in Leningrad (1932). The two squares, Black and Red, were the centerpiece of the show. This last square, despite the author's note 1913 on the reverse, is believed to have been created in the late twenties or early thirties, for there are no earlier mentions of it.

Malevich's student Anna Leporskaya observed that Malevich "neither knew nor understood what the black square contained. He thought it so important an event in his creation that for a whole week he was unable to eat, drink or sleep."

In 1918, Malevich decorated a play, Mystery-Bouffe, by Vladimir Mayakovskiy produced by Vsevolod Meyerhold. He was interested in aerial photography and aviation, which led him to abstractions inspired by or derived from aerial landscapes.

Some Ukrainian authors argue that Malevich's Suprematism is rooted in the traditional Ukrainian culture.

Post-revolution
After the October Revolution (1917), Malevich became a member of the Collegium on the Arts of Narkompros, the Commission for the Protection of Monuments and the Museums Commission (all from 1918–1919). He taught at the Vitebsk Practical Art School in Belarus (1919–1922) alongside Marc Chagall, the Leningrad Academy of Arts (1922–1927), the Kiev Art Institute (1928–1930), and the House of the Arts in Leningrad (1930). He wrote the book The World as Non-Objectivity, which was published in Munich in 1926 and translated into English in 1959. In it, he outlines his Suprematist theories.

In 1923, Malevich was appointed director of Petrograd State Institute of Artistic Culture, which was forced to close in 1926 after a Communist party newspaper called it "a government-supported monastery" rife with "counterrevolutionary sermonizing and artistic debauchery." The Soviet state was by then heavily promoting an idealized, propagandistic style of art called Socialist Realism—a style Malevich had spent his entire career repudiating. Nevertheless, he swam with the current, and was quietly tolerated by the Communists.

International recognition and banning

In 1927, Malevich traveled to Warsaw where he was given a hero's welcome. There, he met with artists and former students Władysław Strzemiński and Katarzyna Kobro, whose own movement, Unism, was highly influenced by Malevich. He held his first foreign exhibit in the Hotel Polonia Palace. From there, the painter ventured on to Berlin and Munich for a retrospective which finally brought him international recognition. He arranged to leave most of the paintings behind when he returned to the Soviet Union. Malevich's assumption that a shifting in the attitudes of the Soviet authorities toward the modernist art movement would take place after the death of Vladimir Lenin and Leon Trotsky's fall from power was proven correct in a couple of years, when the government of Joseph Stalin turned against forms of abstraction, considering them a type of "bourgeois" art, that could not express social realities. As a consequence, many of his works were confiscated and he was banned from creating and exhibiting similar art.

In autumn 1930, he was arrested and interrogated by the KGB in Leningrad, accused of Polish espionage, and threatened with execution. He was released from imprisonment in early December.

Critics derided Malevich's art as a negation of everything good and pure: love of life and love of nature. The Westernizer artist and art historian Alexandre Benois was one such critic. Malevich responded that art can advance and develop for art's sake alone, saying that "art does not need us, and it never did".

Death

When Malevich died of cancer at the age of fifty-seven, in Leningrad on 15 May 1935, his friends and disciples buried his ashes in a grave marked with a black square. They didn't fulfill his stated wish to have the grave topped with an "architekton"—one of his skyscraper-like maquettes of abstract forms, equipped with a telescope through which visitors were to gaze at Jupiter.

On his deathbed, Malevich had been exhibited with the Black Square above him, and mourners at his funeral rally were permitted to wave a banner bearing a black square. Malevich had asked to be buried under an oak tree on the outskirts of Nemchinovka, a place to which he felt a special bond. His ashes were sent to Nemchinovka, and buried in a field near his dacha. Nikolai Suetin, a friend of Malevich's and a fellow artist, designed a white cube with a black square to mark the burial site. The memorial was destroyed during World War II. The city of Leningrad bestowed a pension on Malevich's mother and daughter.

In Nazi Germany his works were banned as "Degenerate Art".

In 2013, an apartment block was built on the place of the tomb and burial site of Kazimir Malevich. Another nearby monument to Malevich, put up in 1988, is now also situated on the grounds of a gated community.

Painting technique 
According to an observation by radiologist and art historian Milda Victurina, one of the features of Kazimir Malevich's painting technique was the layering of paints one on another to get a special kind of colour spots. For example, Malevich used two layers of colour for the red spot—the lower black and the upper red. The light ray going through these colour layers is perceived by the viewer not as red, but with a touch of darkness. This technique of superimposing the two colours allowed experts to identify fakes of Malevich's work, which generally lacked it.

Polish ethnicity

Malevich's family was one of the millions of Poles who lived within the Russian Empire following the Partitions of Poland. Kazimir  Malevich was born near Kiev on lands that had previously been part of the Polish–Lithuanian Commonwealth of parents who were ethnic Poles.

Both Polish, Ukrainian and Russian were native languages of Malevich, who would sign his artwork in the Polish form of his name as Kazimierz Malewicz. In a visa application to travel to France, Malewicz claimed Polish as his nationality. French art historian Andrei Nakov, who re-established Malevich's birth year as 1879 (and not 1878), has argued for restoration of the Polish spelling of Malevich's name.

In 1985, Polish performance artist Zbigniew Warpechowski performed "Citizenship for a Pure Feeling of Kazimierz Malewicz" as an homage to the great artist and critique of Polish authorities that refused to grant Polish citizenship to Kazimir Malevich. In 2013, Malevich's family in New York City and fans founded the not-for-profit The Rectangular Circle of Friends of Kazimierz Malewicz, whose dedicated goal is to promote awareness of Kazimir's Polish ethnicity.

Russian art historian  gained access to the artist's criminal case and found that in some documents Malevich specified his nationality as Ukrainian.

Posthumous exhibitions

Alfred H. Barr Jr. included several paintings in the groundbreaking exhibition "Cubism and Abstract Art" at the Museum of Modern Art in New York in 1936. In 1939, the Museum of Non-Objective Painting opened in New York, whose founder, Solomon R. Guggenheim—an early and passionate collector of the Russian avant-garde—was inspired by the same aesthetic ideals and spiritual quest that exemplified Malevich's art.

The first U.S. retrospective of Malevich's work in 1973 at the Solomon R. Guggenheim Museum provoked a flood of interest and further intensified his impact on postwar American and European artists. However, most of Malevich's work and the story of the Russian avant-garde remained under lock and key until Glasnost. In 1989, the Stedelijk Museum in Amsterdam held the West's first large-scale Malevich retrospective, including the paintings they owned and works from the collection of Russian art critic Nikolai Khardzhiev.

Collections
Malevich's works are held in several major art museums, including the State Tretyakov Gallery in Moscow, and in New York, the Museum of Modern Art and the Guggenheim Museum. The Stedelijk Museum in Amsterdam owns 24 Malevich paintings, more than any other museum outside of Russia. Another major collection of Malevich works is held by the State Museum of Contemporary Art in Thessaloniki.

Art market

Black Square, the fourth version of his magnum opus painted in the 1920s, was discovered in 1993 in Samara and purchased by Inkombank for US$250,000. In April 2002, the painting was auctioned for an equivalent of US$1 million. The purchase was financed by the Russian philanthropist Vladimir Potanin, who donated funds to the Russian Ministry of Culture, and ultimately, to the State Hermitage Museum collection. According to the Hermitage website, this was the largest private contribution to state art museums since the October Revolution.

In 2008, the Stedelijk Museum restituted five works to the heirs of Malevich's family from a group that had been left in Berlin by Malevich, and acquired by the gallery in 1958, in exchange for undisputed title to the remaining pictures.

On 3 November 2008, one of these works entitled Suprematist Composition from 1916, set the world record for any Russian work of art and any work sold at auction for that year, selling at Sotheby's in New York City for just over US$60 million (surpassing his previous record of US$17 million set in 2000).

In May 2018, the same painting Suprematist Composition 1916 sold at Christie's New York for over US$85 million (including fees), a record auction price for a Russian work of art.

In popular culture
Malevich's life inspires many references featuring events and the paintings as players. The smuggling of Malevich paintings out of Russia is a key to the plot line of writer Martin Cruz Smith's thriller Red Square. Noah Charney's novel, The Art Thief tells the story of two stolen Malevich White on White paintings, and discusses the implications of Malevich's radical Suprematist compositions on the art world. British artist Keith Coventry has used Malevich's paintings to make comments on modernism, in particular his Estate Paintings. Malevich's work also is featured prominently in the Lars von Trier film, Melancholia. At the Closing Ceremony of the 2014 Winter Olympics in Sochi, Malevich visual themes were featured (via projections) in a section on 20th century Russian modern art.

Selected works
 1912 – Morning in the Country after Snowstorm
 1912 – The Woodcutter
 1912–13 – Reaper on Red Background 
 1914 – The Aviator
 1914 – An Englishman in Moscow
 1914 – Soldier of the First Division
 1915 – Black Square
 1915 – Red Square †
 1915 – Black Square and Red Square ††
 1915 – Suprematist Composition
 1915 – Suprematism (1915)
 1915 – Suprematist Painting: Aeroplane Flying
 1915 – Suprematism: Self-Portrait in Two Dimensions
 1915–16 – Suprematist Painting (Ludwigshafen)
 1916 – Suprematist Painting (1916)
 1916 – Supremus No. 56
 1916–17 – Suprematism (1916–17)
 1917 – Suprematist Painting (1917)
 1918 – White on White
 1919–1926 – Untitled (Suprematist Composition)
 1928–1932 – Complex Presentiment: Half-Figure in a Yellow Shirt
 1932–1934 – Running Man

† Also known as Red Square: Painterly Realism of a Peasant Woman in Two Dimensions.
†† Also known as Black Square and Red Square: Painterly Realism of a Boy with a Knapsack - Color Masses in the Fourth Dimension.

Gallery

See also 
 List of Russian artists
 Sergei Senkin
 Oberiu
 UNOVIS

Footnotes

Citations

References
 Crone, Rainer, Kazimir Severinovich Malevich, and David Moos. Kazimir Malevich: The Climax of Disclosure. Chicago: University of Chicago Press, 1991. 
 Dreikausen, Margret, Aerial Perception: The Earth as Seen from Aircraft and Spacecraft and Its Influence on Contemporary Art (Associated University Presses: Cranbury, NJ; London, England; Mississauga, Ontario: 1985).  
 Drutt, Matthew; Malevich, Kazimir, Kazimir Malevich: suprematism, Guggenheim Museum, 2003, 
 Honour, H. and Fleming, J. (2009) A World History of Art. 7th edn. London: Laurence King Publishing. 
 Malevich, Kasimir, The Non-objective World, Chicago: P. Theobald, 1959.  
 Malevich and his Influence, Kunstmuseum Liechtenstein, 2008. 
 Milner, John; Malevich, Kazimir, Kazimir Malevich and the art of geometry, Yale University Press, 1996. 
 Nakov, Andrei, Kasimir Malevich, Catalogue raisonné, Paris, Adam Biro, 2002
 Nakov, Andrei, vol. IV of Kasimir Malevich, le peintre absolu, Paris, Thalia Édition, 2007
 Néret, Gilles, Kazimir Malevich and Suprematism 1878-1935, Taschen, 2003.  
 Petrova, Yevgenia, Kazimir Malevich in the State Russian Museum. Palace Editions, 2002. . (English Edition)
 Shatskikh, Aleksandra S, and Marian Schwartz, Black Square: Malevich and the Origin of Suprematism, 2012. 
 Shishanov, V.A. Vitebsk Museum of Modern Art: a History of Creation and a Collection. 1918–1941. - Minsk: Medisont, 2007. - 144 p.Mylivepage.ru
 Tedman, Gary. Soviet Avant Garde Aesthetics, chapter from Aesthetics & Alienation. pp 203–229. 2012. Zero Books. 
 Tolstaya, Tatyana, The Square, The New Yorker, 12 June 2015
 Das weiße Rechteck. Schriften zum Film, herausgegeben von Oksana Bulgakowa. PotemkinPress, Berlin 1997, 
 The White Rectangle. Writings on Film. (In English and the Russian original manuscript). Edited by Oksana Bulgakowa. PotemkinPress, Berlin / Francisco 2000,

Autobiographies 
Malevich wrote two biographical essays, a shorter one in 1923–25, and a much longer account in 1933, representing the artist's explanation of his own evolution up to the appearance of suprematism at the 1915 "0–10" exhibition in Petrograd.

Both are published in:

 

Abridged and revised translations are published in:

 

The 1923–25 autobiography appears in:

 

The 1933 autobiography appears in:

External links 

 Malevich works, MoMA
 Kazimir Malevich, Guggenheim Collection Online
 Kasimir Malevich Works Online, Artcyclopedia
Floirat, Anetta. 2016, The Scythian element of the Russian primitivism, in music and visual arts. Based on the work Goncharova, Malevich, Roerich, Stravinsky and Prokofiev
 Peter Brooke, Deux Peintres Philosophes - Albert Gleizes et Kasimir Malévitch and Quelques Réflexions sur la Littérature Actuelle du Cubisme, both Ampuis (Association des Amis d’Albert Gleizes) 1995
 History of Malevich-designed Perfume bottle of the eau de cologne “Severny”

1879 births
1935 deaths
Abstract painters
Artists from Kyiv
Ukrainian people of Polish descent
19th-century painters from the Russian Empire
20th-century Russian painters
Futurist painters
People from the Russian Empire of Polish descent
Painters from the Russian Empire
Russian male painters
Modern painters
Polish painters
Polish male painters
Russian avant-garde
Soviet painters
Suprematism (art movement)
Ukrainian avant-garde
Ukrainian painters
Ukrainian male painters
Ukrainian sculptors
Ukrainian male sculptors
Deaths from prostate cancer
Deaths from cancer in the Soviet Union
19th-century male artists from the Russian Empire
20th-century Russian male artists
Moscow School of Painting, Sculpture and Architecture alumni